The Clown is a 1953 American drama film starring Red Skelton with Jane Greer and Tim Considine, and directed by Robert Z. Leonard. The story is derived from  The Champ (1931).

Plot

Dodo the Clown is a funny man with a serious drinking problem. He is famous in the business for falling off the Ziegfeld Follies stage, drunk, and punching his longtime manager. His son, Dink, is his biggest fan and his caretaker. Dodo's current act is heckling customers coming off a carnival ride, where moving sidewalks, railings, gusts of air and a light shock from Dodo's wand make onlookers, and most of the victims, roar with laughter. An arrogant, humorless young man, embarrassed in front of his date, knocks Dodo to the floor. When the amusement park stage manager examines Dodo's cut lip, Dodo accuses him of trying to smell his breath. He is sober and has been so for a month: Dink bears witness. But the quarrel is the last straw, and Gallagher fires him.

Despite Dink's best efforts, Dodo ruins a job audition—and loses his agent—by turning up drunk. Dink undresses Dodo and puts him to bed. In the morning, the boy goes to see “Uncle Goldie”, Dodo's old agent, who accepts Dodo as a client and gives him $50 “to bind the deal”. Goldie recalls the clown's great days from the Ziegfeld Follies. After Dink leaves, Goldie tells a skeptical associate about the infamous punch, taking half the blame.

Hoagley, another colleague of Goldie's, offers Dodo a one-night engagement at a sales convention at the Ritz, and father and son talk enthusiastically of a new life. They go to a pawn shop to retrieve Dodo's tuxedo as well as a watch that Flo Ziegfeld gave him. He presents it to Dink as a gift. At the hotel that night, Goldie doesn't want Dodo to perform, because the part is that of a receiver, a stooge, but Dodo agrees to endure the humiliation if Goldie takes Dink away.

Dodo's ex-wife Paula Henderson and her new husband, Ralph, a successful businessman, are in the audience. She does not recognize Dink until the boy embraces Dodo. Henderson goes backstage to say that Paula wants to see her son, whom she surrendered during the divorce because Dodo was a wealthy star.

Dodo takes $200 from Henderson and sends Dink to the hotel room, where he tells Paula about his father. He thinks his mother died a long time ago. She tells him who she is, but he is not impressed.

Dodo promptly loses the money in a dice game, as well as the watch, which he takes while Dink is asleep. The guy who won the watch offers to sell it back. In the morning, Henderson asks for the boy. Dink discovers the watch is missing and is crushed.

Dodo takes a job at a stag party—with strippers—for the $65 he needs to buy back the watch. When the police raid the event, Goldie bails him out. Goldie is bewildered: He  would have given Dodo $6,500, if he had asked. Dodo tells Goldie to taken Dink to his mother, telling the boy he doesn't like him anymore and slapping him. After Dink and Goldie leave, Dodo, weeping, punches an old picture of himself over and over, crying, “I hit my kid! I hit my kid!…”

Dink is welcomed by the Hendersons, but he runs away.

Goldie comes up with a great opportunity for television, The Dodo Delwyn Show.  Dodo refuses, until Dink appears. Dink is thrilled at the chance for a comeback. During rehearsal, Dodo has a moment of breathlessness during a stair-climbing routine.

The Hendersons come to the opening broadcast. Paula tells Dodo that Dink belongs with him. He has done a wonderful job.

The show is a huge success. After several acts, Dodo gets dizzy but insists on finishing with a “topsy turvy” sketch where a drunk wakes to find the room turned on its side, thanks to his wife and a helpful carpenter. He takes his bow, thanking the audience for “filling his heart.” Offstage, he collapses and dies. Inconsolable, Dink ricochets from man to man, calling for his father, then runs to Paula's arms, calling her Mother, and crying “Dodo is dead!” over and over as they walk away.

Cast

 Red Skelton as Dodo Delwyn
 Tim Considine as Dink
 Jane Greer as Paula Henderson
 Philip Ober as Ralph Z. Henderson
 Loring Smith as Goldie
 Lou Lubin as Little Julie
 Fay Roope as Doctor Strauss
 Walter Reed as Joe Hoagley
 Eddie Marr as television director
 Jonathan Cott as floor director
 Don Beddoe as Gallagher
 Steve Forrest as young man
 Frank Nelson as Charlie (uncredited)
 Shirley Mitchell (1953) as Mrs. Blotto (uncredited)

Production
The Ziegfeld Follies flashback is a 6-minute ballet class number taken from MGM's Bathing Beauty, the 1944 film starring Red Skelton, with Esther Williams and Basil Rathbone.

When the film was released, Skelton was a familiar figure to American television audiences.  The Red Skelton Show debuted on September 30, 1951, on NBC, in a half-hour format like the one used on Dodo Delwyn's fictional show. With changes of network, format (to one hour) and name, to The Red Skelton Hour in 1962, it lasted until 1971.

The cast includes actors worth noting: Young Tim Considine was on the brink of a successful career that includes a long stint with Disney. The part of Eddie, the gambler to whom Dodo loses the watch, is played by Charles Buchinsky, better known as Charles Bronson . Steve Forrest and Roger Moore, two “men” had important careers ahead of them.  Other familiar voices and face include Billy Barty, who would be a regular on Skelton's TV show. Frank Nelson, who plays the comic, Charlie, was a staple radio voice on Jack Benny's show, among others, and became familiar to television audiences in memorable roles that included appearances on every season of I Love Lucy.

Reception
The New York Times critic A. W. found much to like in the film and praised Skelton's performance:

“It has been more than twenty years since Metro released its slightly saccharine but sturdy "The Champ," …so a new generation should not feel especially cheated to have the story refurbished for the atomic age. ,,,credit is due Martin Rackin and Leonard Praskins for their adaptation of the Frances Marion story, since it manages to avoid unnecessary bathos and to Director Robert Z. Leonard's handling of his principals…While the mixture of tears and a small measure of laughs is as before it is not too cloying a compound. Since Red Skelton is no stranger to clowning and greasepaint it is pleasant to report that he takes to the role—a characterization only slightly related to the slapstick assignments which have been his lot—like an aspiring "Hamlet."  And, as in the previous edition, our hero desperately clings to the love he has for his son, a sturdy and self-reliant little citizen, who not only takes care of himself but of his old man. … Red Skelton illustrates quite competently that he can read a straight line as well as fall on his face. However, the pratfalls are not missing entirely as he is permitted to run through a couple of his familiar routines. Tim Considine is properly wistful, serious and manly as his adoring youngster, and Jane Greer as his ex-wife; Loring Smith as his understanding agent and Lou Lubin as a 10 percenter handling sleazy entertainment, add adequate supporting portrayals. 'Show business,' one of the principals remarks, 'is either feast or famine.' In the case of The Clown it is a combination of both.”

In a 2005 article about the film, Turner Classic Movies observed: “Most reviews at the time were lukewarm to the movie, but had praise for Skelton's dramatic turn. As Variety noted, ‘The presentation is given a sincerity in performances, writing and direction that keeps the sentiment from dipping too far into the maudlin, and while the story has an old-fashioned feel, it is fundamentally okay drama that takes nicely to the updating.’ Aside from Skelton and Considine, the reviewer also has kudos for Jane Greer, who '...is exceptionally good as the ex-wife, giving the role a warmth that makes it believable.' “

Box office
According to MGM records the film earned $1,539,000 in the US and Canada and $560,000 elsewhere, resulting in a profit of $437,000.

References
Notes

External links
 
 
 
 

1953 films
1953 drama films
American black-and-white films
American drama films
Remakes of American films
Films about alcoholism
Films about clowns
Films directed by Robert Z. Leonard
Films scored by David Rose
Metro-Goldwyn-Mayer films
1950s English-language films
1950s American films